Aurel Jivi (1943–2002) was a priest in the Romanian Orthodox Church. He was a teacher and writer.

Life
Jivi was born in Chişoda, Timiș County, Romania, on August 2, 1943. He took his first degree from the Sibiu Theological Institute in 1967 and then a master's degree in Theology from McCormick Theological Seminary, Chicago in 1973. He completed his doctoral studies at the Bucharest Theological Institute in 1982, with a dissertation on "Orthodoxy in America".

He became a full-time professor at the Sibiu Theological Institute, Department of Universal Church History, in 1983; he also taught at the Faculty of Theology in Oradea, and lectured for several universities in the United States and Great Britain. He was ordained an Orthodox priest in 1993. Father Jivi wrote extensively on topics related to his field of research, but he was also a proficient translator. He died in Sibiu, in 2002.

Works (in Romanian)

 . în MB, an. XIX. 1969, nr. 4–6, p. 226-235;
 , în BOR, an. LXXXVIII, 1969, nr. 11–12, p. 1248–1256;
 , ST, an. XXII, 1970, nr. 1 -2, p. 118-128,
 , în ST, an.  XXII, 1970, nr. 5 -6, p. 452-460;
 , în BOR, an.  LXXXVIII, 1970, nr. 5–6, p. 587–596;
 , în ST, an. XXVII, 1975, nr. 3–4, p. 219–225;
 , în BOR, an. XCIX, 1981, nr. 78, p. 912–917;
 , în ST, an. XXXIII, 1981, nr. 7-10, p. 606–613;
 , în ST. an. XXXVI, 1984, nr. 7–8, p. 482–493;
 , în MMS, an. LXIII, 1987, nr. 5. p. 101–111,
 , în vol. Contribuţii transilvănene la teologia ortodoxă, Sibiu, 1988, p. 101–118;
 , în RT, an. I (73), 1991, nr. 2, p. 23–32;
 , în vol. , Sibiu, 1992 p. 39-57;
 , în RT, an. II (74), 1992, nr. 3. p. 17–27:
 , în vol. Persoană şi comuniune, Prinos de cinstire Pr. Prof Acad.  Dumitru Stăniloaie, Sibiu, 1993, p. 386–397.

Translations (from English)

 Keith Hitchins, . 1846–1873. București, 1995, 343p.
 Other articles and reviews published in: "Biserica Ortodoxă Română", "Studii Teologice", "Mitropolia Ardealului", "Ecumenical Review", and "Byzantinoslavica".

External links
The Aurel Jivi Society (Blog)

1943 births
2002 deaths
Romanian Orthodox priests
21st-century Eastern Orthodox priests
20th-century Eastern Orthodox priests
People from Timiș County
McCormick Theological Seminary alumni